This is a list of Law Clerks and Parliamentary Counsel of the House of Commons of Canada.

 Gustavus W. Wicksteed – 1867–1887
 William Wilson – 1887–1890
 Frederick Augustus McCord – 1890–1908
 A.H. O'Brien – 1909–1914
 Francis A. Gisborne – 1914–1922
 Joseph K. Foran – 1923–1924
 Arthur Gordon Troop – 1924–1925
 Paul Maurice Ollivier – 1925–1952
 Arthur Gordon Troop – 1926–1936
 Arthur Angus Fraser – 1938–1952
 Paul Maurice Ollivier – 1952–1970
 Joseph Maingot – 1971–1982
 Marcel R. Pelletier – 1983–1991
 Robert R. Walsh – 1999–2012
 Richard Denis (acting) – 2012–2013
 Richard Fujarczuk – May 2013–February 2014
 Richard Denis (acting) – 2014–2015
 Philippe Dufresne – February 2015–present

Notes

References
 Officers and Officials of Parliament

Law Clerks
Lists of Canadian civil servants
House of Commons of Canada
Ceremonial officers in Canada